Operation Diplomat is a 1953 British drama film directed by John Guillermin and produced by Ernest G. Roy.

It was one of Guillermin's earliest movies. A profile on the director called it "perhaps the first example of prime Guillermin... a 70-minute programmer so tautly directed that every image counts, every detail matters, every actor's movement feels perfectly timed – a true gem."

Plot summary
A surgeon operating on an unknown patient discovers he is involved in the kidnapping of a British diplomat. When his personal secretary is murdered for revealing the patient's identity, the police are called in.

Cast

Critical reception
The Monthly Film Bulletin called it an "energetic yet improbable figure with too many points left unexplained."

TV Guide wrote, "this film is hard to swallow, but the nonstop action helps cover up the gaping holes in the plot."

Filmink said "it's crisply done."

References

External links

Operation Diplomant at Letterbox DVD
Operation Diplomat as Reel Streets

Films directed by John Guillermin
1953 films
British spy drama films
Cold War spy films
1950s spy drama films
Films produced by Ernest G. Roy
1953 drama films
British black-and-white films
1950s English-language films
1950s British films
Films based on television series